Wake is a surname. Notable people with the surname include:

Brian Wake (born 1982), English footballer
Bronwyn Wake, Australian scientist
Cameron Wake (born 1982), American football linebacker
David B. Wake (1936–2021), American biologist and herpetologist
Harry Wake (1901–1981), English footballer
Hereward the Wake (born 1035), 11th-century Anglo-Saxon leader
Sir Hereward Wake, 13th Baronet (1876-1963), British Army general
Sir Hereward Wake, 14th Baronet (1916–2017), British Army officer and countryman
Isaac Wake (1580–1632), English diplomat and political commentator
Jenny Wake, New Zealand actor and theatre director
John Wake (born 1953), English cricketer
Jehanne Wake (born 1966), British biographer
Joan Wake (1884–1974), British historian
Margaret Wake, 3rd Baroness Wake of Liddell (1297–1349), wife of Edmund of Woodstock, 1st Earl of Kent
Marvalee Wake (born 1939), American biologist
Melissa Anne Wake, New Zealand paediatric academic
Nancy Wake (1912–2011), New Zealand born Australian who served as a British spy during World War II
Neil Vincent Wake (born 1948), United States federal judge
Ric Wake, record producer
Robert A. Wake, 1966 champion of the Scripps National Spelling Bee
Thomas Wake, 2nd Baron Wake of Liddell (1297–1349), English baron
Thomas Wake (disambiguation)
William Wake (1657–1737), Archbishop of Canterbury
Sir William Wake, 8th Baronet (1742–1785), British politician 
William Wake (cricketer) (1852–1896), English amateur first-class cricketer
William Wake (governor), governor of Bombay

See also
Wake baronets